Robert Steven Ferley (born 4 February 1982) is a former English professional cricketer who played for Kent County Cricket Club and Nottinghamshire County Cricket Club. He bowled slow left-arm orthodox spin. He was born in Norwich in 1982.

Ferley attended Sutton Valence School near Maidstone in Kent. He played for Norfolk County Cricket Club in the 1998 Minor Counties Championship and went on the English Under-19 cricket team to India, taking 4/32 in the second one-day International on the tour. He made his first-class cricket debut in April 2001 for Durham University Centre of Cricketing Excellence. He played nine times for the UCCE whilst studying at Durham University and made three appearances for the British Universities team whilst he was a student.

He made his Second XI debut for Kent in 1999 and made his List A cricket debut for the Kent Cricket Board in September 2001 in the second round of the 2002 Cheltenham & Gloucester Trophy. He made his senior Kent debut in July 2003 in the County Championship. Ferley left Kent to join Nottinghamshire at the end of the 2006 season after finding it difficult to dislodge Min Patel from the Kent team. He played for Nottinghamshire in 2007 and 2008 before returning to Kent for the 2009 and 2010 seasons before being released in July 2010.

Ferley played once for Dorset in the 2010 Minor Counties Championship. As of June 2017 he is the Director of Cricket at Eastbourne College.

References

External links

1982 births
Living people
English cricketers
Kent cricketers
Nottinghamshire cricketers
Kent Cricket Board cricketers
Durham MCCU cricketers
Norfolk cricketers
Dorset cricketers
Cricketers from Norwich
British Universities cricketers
People educated at Sutton Valence School
Alumni of Grey College, Durham